Riemann function may refer to one of the several functions named after the mathematician Bernhard Riemann, including:
Riemann zeta function
Thomae's function, also called the Riemann function
Riemann theta function,
Riemann's R, an approximation of the prime-counting function π(x), see Prime-counting function#Exact form.